Peter Wallace may refer to:

 Peter James Wallace, an Australian former professional rugby league footballer.
Peter Wallace (Canadian civil servant), secretary of the Treasury Board of Canada
 Peter Wallace (cricketer) (born 1946), New Zealand cricketer
 Peter Leslie Wallace, An Australian/Filipino businessman and newspaper columnist.
 Peter Margetson Wallace, a former general officer in the British Army
 Peter Rudy Wallace, an American politician.
 Peter Wallace (buccaneer), a 17th century buccaneer in the Bay of Honduras.